This was the first edition of the tournament. 

Cristina Bucșa and Weronika Falkowska won the title, defeating Angelina Gabueva and Anastasia Zakharova in the final, 7–6(7–4), 6–1.

Seeds

Draw

Draw

References

External Links
Draw

2022 WTA 125 tournaments